The 1919 Ohio State Buckeyes football team represented Ohio State University in the 1919 college football season. The Buckeyes compiled a 6–1 record. Outscoring opponents 176–12, the Buckeyes scored their first 133 points in the first three games. This season represents the first time Ohio State beat Michigan in the rivalry.

Schedule

Coaching staff
 John Wilce, head coach, seventh year

References

Ohio State
Ohio State Buckeyes football seasons
Ohio State Buckeyes football